is a Japanese manga anthology written and illustrated by Keiko Kinoshita. It is licensed in North America by Digital Manga Publishing, which released the manga on 27 June 2007.

Reception
Leroy Douresseaux, writing for Comic Book Bin, described the manga as "non-graphic", noting the stories were tied together by featuring boys and young men who "cry at the simplest things".  He preferred the short story "Raika". Patricia Beard, writing for Mania Entertainment, found the "whispy, linear style" of Kinoshita's artwork made her feel as if she was witnessing the emotions changing, not just as still pictures on a page, and enjoyed the writing of the short stories. Katherine Farmar, writing for Comics Village, found the BL stories in the anthology had a "very effective atmosphere of wistful yearning", but found "Raika"  "creepy".  Farmar also noted the "sketchiness" of the artwork, feeling this lent the characters an air of being "as reluctant to stake out a permanent place on the page as to make a definite declaration of love."

References

External links

Manga anthologies
2004 manga
2004 in comics
Yaoi anime and manga
Digital Manga Publishing titles